Curium(III) chloride is the chemical compound with the formula CmCl3.

Structure 

Curium(III) chloride has a 9 coordinate tricapped trigonal prismatic geometry.

Preparation 

Curium(III) chloride can be prepared by the reaction of curium nitride with cadmium chloride.

References 

Curium compounds
Nuclear materials
Chlorides
Actinide halides